Stuart Berry is a rugby union referee on the elite panel of the South African Rugby Union that has been included on the Super Rugby refereeing panel since 2011.

He was born in Durban and schooled at Hillcrest High School before he attained a Master of Science in hydrology at the University of KwaZulu-Natal. He owns a company in Durban that manages sporting events and music events.

Career

Berry was first included on the SANZAR's Super Rugby refereeing panel in 2011 and was in charge of seven Super Rugby matches over the next three seasons.

References

External links
 

Living people
South African rugby union referees
1982 births
Super Rugby referees
SARU referees
Currie Cup referees
United Rugby Championship referees